Lucio Massari (22 January 1569 – 3 November 1633) was an Italian painter of the School of Bologna. He can be described as painting during both Mannerist and early-Baroque periods.

Life and work
He was born in Bologna, where he initially apprenticed with an unknown painter by the name of Spinelli, then the Mannerist painter Bartolomeo Passarotti, but also worked with Bartolomeo Cesi. In 1592, he joined the Carracci studio or the Academy of the Incamminati, and remained attached to Ludovico Carracci for many years. In 1604, he worked with Ludovico to fresco Stories of San Mauro, San Benedetto and others in the cloister of San Michele in Bosco. In 1607, he collaborated with Lionello Spada and Francesco Brizio in frescoes for the Palazzo Bonfioli, in Bologna. In 1610, he visited Rome, remaining under the patronage of Cardinal Facchinetti, and befriended Domenichino. In 1612, he completed the frescoes left unfinished by Bernardino Poccetti in a chapel of the Certosa di Galluzzo, near Florence. He painted the main altarpiece for the church of Santa Maria in Guadi in San Giovanni in Persiceto.

He returned to Bologna in 1614, and soon traveled with Francesco Albani to work in Mantua. He is said to have spent so much time in hunting, fishing, and the delights of the countryside, that he neglected painting, though his biography shows him to be exceedingly prolific in altarpieces. Among his pupils were Sebastiano Brunetti, Antonio Randa, and Fra Bonaventura Bisi.

External links

 Blood of the Redeemer at Museum of Fine Arts, Boston

1569 births
1633 deaths
16th-century Italian painters
Italian male painters
17th-century Italian painters
Painters from Bologna
Italian Baroque painters
Mannerist painters
Fresco painters